The tenth and final season of CSI: Miami premiered on CBS on September 25, 2011, and is the shortest season of CSI: Miami with only 19 episodes. The series stars David Caruso, Emily Procter and Adam Rodriguez.

Description 
As Horatio faces a painful recovery from his gunshot wound, Natalia faces an emotional recovery from her near-death experience. Calleigh attempts to adopt two children, whilst Delko and Wolfe are assigned to supervise new CSI Sam Owens, a task that ends up putting Wolfe at risk. A sadistic killer, a Mexican sheriff, an eccentric genius, and a rabid dog are among the killers, witnesses, and victims this season, as the sun goes down on Miami.

Production 
All members of the main cast returned for this season, whilst Eva LaRue planned to depart the cast subsequently. Adam Rodriguez wrote and produced the episode "At Risk", based on the Penn State scandal. The series finale aired on April 8, 2012, but was delayed due to extended coverage of the Masters. In May 2012, CBS cancelled CSI: Miami, making it the first show in the CSI franchise to end.

Cast

Main cast 
 David Caruso as Horatio Caine; a Lieutenant and the Director of the MDPD Crime Lab.
 Emily Procter as Calleigh Duquesne; a veteran Detective, the CSI Assistant Supervisor and a ballistics expert.
 Adam Rodriguez as Eric Delko; a CSI Detective.
 Jonathan Togo as Ryan Wolfe; a CSI Detective.
 Rex Linn as Frank Tripp; a senior homicide Detective.
 Eva LaRue as Natalia Boa Vista; a CSI Detective. 
 Omar Benson Miller as Walter Simmons; an art-theft specialist and CSI Detective.

Recurring cast 
 Taylor Cole as Samantha Owens; a CSI Detective assigned to Caine's team.
 Malcolm McDowell as Darren Vogel; an Attorney and a nemesis of the CSIs.
 Christian Clemenson as Tom Loman; the team's Medical Examiner.
 Alana de la Garza as Marisol Delko-Caine; Horatio's late wife and Delko's sister.
 Robert LaSardo as Memmo Fierro; a member of the Mala Noche.
 Carlos Bernard as Diego Navarro; an accomplice to murder and nemesis of the CSIs.
 Ryan McPartlin as Josh Avery; an Assistant States Attorney.

Episodes

References

10
2011 American television seasons
2012 American television seasons